Soorarai Pottru (transl. Hail the brave) is a 2020 Indian Tamil-language Drama Film directed by Sudha Kongara and produced by Suriya and Guneet Monga, under their respective banners 2D Entertainment and Sikhya Entertainment. Kongara conceptualised the script and screenplay along with Shalini Ushadevi, Aalif Surti and Ganeshaa, with dialogues written by Vijay Kumar. Suriya also starred in the film in leading roles with Paresh Rawal and Aparna Balamurali, while Urvashi, Mohan Babu, and Karunas amongst others in supporting roles. The film features music composed by G. V. Prakash Kumar, while cinematography and editing were handled by Niketh Bommireddy and Sathish Suriya respectively. Partially inspired by events from the life of Simplifly Deccan founder G. R. Gopinath, Soorarai Pottru revolves around Nedumaaran Rajangam (Suriya), who dreams to build a low-cost airline and the challenges he faces, in order to be successful in his quest.

The film which was originally scheduled for theatrical release was delayed multiple times due to post-production difficulties, which was followed by the COVID-19 pandemic in India. Soorarai Pottru was later released direct-to-streaming worldwide through the platform Amazon Prime Video on 12 November 2020. The film opened to positive critical response from critics and audiences. Critics praised Suriya's performance and Kongara's direction, scripting and screenplay, along with the performances of the cast and major technical aspects of the film, including cinematography, editing, music. The film is currently the third highest rated film on IMDb (a rating of 8.7), only behind The Shawshank Redemption (1994) and The Godfather (1972).

Soorarai Pottru was selected as one among ten Indian films to be screened under the Best Foreign Film category at the 78th Golden Globe Awards. The film made an official entry to the 93rd Academy Awards, for Best Actor, Best Actress, Best Director, Best Original Score and other categories, and was also made available to the members of the Academy of Motion Picture Arts and Sciences for votes and nomination at the Academy Screening Room. The film also emerged as the only Indian film amongst 366 films eligible for Best Picture in the award ceremony, but was eventually not nominated. Soorarai Pottru was screened at the Chennai International Film Festival and also at the Panorama Section of the Shanghai International Film Festival. The film was screened and won two awards at the Indian Film Festival of Melbourne – including Best Film and Best Actor (Surya). It was nominated at 14 categories at the 10th South Indian International Movie Awards, held for South Indian films released during 2020 and won seven awards.

Awards and nominations

See also 
 List of Tamil films of 2020

Notes

References 

Lists of accolades by Indian film